Cymbidium kanran, the cold-growing cymbidium, is a species of orchid. The species was first described by Makino in 1902 and was first domesticated over 2,500 years ago.

References

kanran
Plants described in 1902